Rafael Perestrello (fl. 1514–1517) was a Portuguese explorer and a cousin of Filipa Moniz Perestrello, the wife of explorer Christopher Columbus. He is best known for landing on the southern shores of mainland China in 1516 and 1517 to trade in Guangzhou (then romanized as "Canton"), after the Portuguese explorer Jorge Álvares landed on Lintin Island within the Pearl River estuary in May 1513. Rafael also served as a trader and naval ship captain for the Portuguese in Sumatra and Portuguese-conquered Malacca.

João de Barros (1496–1570) wrote that Rafael Perestrello almost became lost while sailing by the Andaman Islands, but ventured safely through territory that was rumored to be inhabited by native cannibals.

Family background

Filippo Perestrello (also known as Filippone Pallastrelli), Rafael's great-grandfather and son of Gabriele Palastrelli and wife Madama Bertolina, was a nobleman from the Italian city of Piacenza who moved with his wife Catarina Sforza to Portugal in 1385, living in Porto and then in Lisbon to conduct trade. Filippo and Catarina had four children: Richarte (sometimes referred to as Rafael), Isabel (married to Aires Anes de Beja), Branca (who had natural issue by Dom Pedro de Noronha, 4th Archbishop of Lisbon from 1424 to 1452) and Bartolomeu (father-in-law to Christopher Columbus by his daughter Filipa). Richarte Perestrello (b. 1410) became a Prior in the parish of Santa Marinha in Lisbon, yet fathered two children who he legitimized in 1423. Rafael was the son of Richarte's son João Lopes.

Voyages to China
Rafael sailed in a ship from Portuguese Malacca to Guangzhou in southern China in 1516, sent by Afonso de Albuquerque, the Viceroy of Estado da India, in order to secure trading relations with the Chinese during the reign of the Ming dynasty ruler Zhengde (r. 1505–1521). Rafael traveled with a crew from a Malaysian junk, bringing back profitable trade items and glowing reports about China's commercial potential. In fact, his report on China was one of the main reasons why Fernão Pires de Andrade decided to carry out his mission in going to China instead of Bengal in 1517. Rafael was admitted into port by Chinese authorities in order to trade with the merchants there, but was not allowed to move further. In 1517, Rafael piloted yet another trade mission to Guangzhou.

Rafael Perestrello's mission was followed up in 1517 by the Portuguese apothecary Tomé Pires and pharmacist, merchant, and diplomat Fernão Pires de Andrade, in a diplomatic mission to Ming China commissioned by Manuel I of Portugal (1495–1521). Initial trade and diplomatic missions were temporarily ruined once wild rumors of Portuguese cannibalizing Chinese children was coupled with real events of Portuguese settlers breaking Chinese laws, pillaging Chinese villages, and taking off with female captives; the Chinese responded by burning and capturing Portuguese ships, detaining Portuguese prisoners, and executing some who were captured. The ex-sultan Mahmud Shah of Malacca had also sent diplomatic envoys to Ming dynasty China to seek aid in expelling the Portuguese from Malacca; although this was never carried out, the sultan's mission did succeed in convincing the Ming court in rejecting the Portuguese embassy of Andrade and Pires after the death of the Zhengde Emperor in 1521.

Despite these initial hostilities, a Portuguese settlement was eventually established at Macau and granted consent by the Chinese government in 1557, while annual Portuguese trade missions to Shangchuan Island took place since 1549. Leonel de Sousa, the second Governor of Macau, had smoothed out relations between the Chinese and Portuguese in the early 1550s, following a Portuguese effort to eliminate pirates along the coasts of China. The 1554 Luso-Chinese agreement finally legalized trade between the two realms.

A captain in Sumatra

Rafael served as a captain under Jorge de Albuquerque, the younger cousin of Afonso, when the former was governor of Malacca and battled against the Islamic Kingdom of Pacem in Sumatra in 1514 in order to install a ruler there that was friendly to Portuguese interests. While Rafael Perestrello's crew was aiding Jorge de Albuquerque's siege on a fort and large stockade defended by these Sumatran "Moors", a calafate of Rafael's troops named Marques was—according to the historian João de Barros—the first man to scale the heights of the stockade during the fight. The battle against the well-defended fort and ruler of Pacem (whom the Portuguese called Sultan "Geinal") was a success; Albuquerque saw to the installment of the next ruler and favorable trade demands of low prices for Southeast Asian pepper sold to the Portuguese. During Jorge de Albuquerque's second tour of duty, he defeated Mahmud Shah of Malacca at Bintan in 1524, forcing the latter to flee, this time to the Malay Peninsula.

See also
Europeans in Medieval China
Age of Discovery
Henry the Navigator
History of the Ming dynasty
History of Portugal (1415-1542)

References

Citations

Bibliography
Brook, Timothy. (1998). The Confusions of Pleasure: Commerce and Culture in Ming China. Berkeley: University of California Press.  (Paperback).
Dames, Mansel Longworth. (2002) The Book of Duarte Barbosa. New Delhi: J. Jelley; Asian Educational Services. 
Dion, Mark. "Sumatra through Portuguese Eyes: Excerpts from João de Barros' 'Decadas da Asia'," Indonesia (Volume 9; 1970): 128–162.
Douglas, Robert Kennaway. (2006). Europe and the Far East. Adamant Media Corporation. .
Madariaga, Salvador de. (1940). Christopher Columbus. New York: The MacMillan Company.
Madureira, Luis. "Tropical Sex Fantasies and the Ambassador's Other Death: The Difference in Portuguese Colonialism," Cultural Critique (Number 28; Fall of 1994): 149–173.
 Wills, John E., Jr. (1998). "Relations with Maritime Europe, 1514–1662," in The Cambridge History of China: Volume 8, The Ming Dynasty, 1368–1644, Part 2, 333–375. Edited by Denis Twitchett and Frederick W. Mote. New York: Cambridge University Press. .
Nowell, Charles E. "The Discovery of the Pacific: A Suggested Change of Approach," The Pacific Historical Review (Volume XVI, Number 1; February, 1947): 1–10.
Pfoundes, C. "Notes on the History of Eastern Adventure, Exploration, and Discovery, and Foreign Intercourse with Japan," Transactions of the Royal Historical Society (Volume X; 1882): 82–92.

Portuguese explorers
Explorers of Asia
16th century in China
Guangzhou
History of Sumatra
History of Malacca
People from Lisbon
Foreign relations of the Ming dynasty
16th-century explorers
Year of birth unknown
Year of death unknown
Maritime history of Portugal
16th-century Portuguese people
History of the foreign relations of China
China–Portugal relations
Portuguese people of Italian descent